Marin Čilić was the defending champion, but was defeated 7–5, 5–7, 3–6 in the final by Andy Murray. Winning in the final meant Murray became the first British player to win three titles at the Queen's Club since Arthur Lowe in the 1920s.

Seeds
The top eight seeds receive a bye into the second round.

Draw

Finals

Top half

Section 1

Section 2

Bottom half

Section 3

Section 4

Qualifying

Seeds
The top six seeds received a bye into the second round.

Qualifiers

Lucky losers
  Frederik Nielsen
  Rohan Bopanna

Qualifying draw

First qualifier

Second qualifier

Third qualifier

Fourth qualifier

References

Main Draw
Qualifying Draw

2013 Aegon Championships